This is a list of people who have been executed. The list is categorised by the reason for execution and the year of the execution is included.

Assassination
 Mohammad Abdullah (1871) assassination of John Paxton Norman
 Sher Ali Afridi (1872) assassination of Viceroy Lord Mayo
 Pakhomy Andreyushkin (1887) conspiracy to assassinate Russian Emperor Aleksandr III
 Narayan Apte (1949) assassination of Mahatma Gandhi
 George Atzerodt (1865) conspiracy to assassinate US President Abraham Lincoln
 Jean Bastien-Thiry (1963) attempted assassination of French President Charles de Gaulle
 John Bellingham (1812) assassination of British Prime Minister Spencer Perceval
 Eliyahu Bet-Zuri (1945) assassination of Lord Moyne
 Mehmet Arif Bey (1926) conspiracy to assassinate Turkish President Mustafa Kemal Pasha
 Mehmed Cavid Bey (1926) conspiracy to assassinate Mustafa Kemal Pasha
 Mehmed Nâzım Bey (1926) conspiracy to assassinate Mustafa Kemal Pasha
 Ziya Hurşit Bey (1926) conspiracy to assassinate Mustafa Kemal Pasha
 Dmitry Bogrov (1911) assassination of Russian Prime Minister Pyotr Stolypin
 Lee Bong-chang (1932) attempted assassination of Japanese Emperor Hirohito
 Yun Bong-gil (1932) assassination of General Yoshinori Shirakawa
 Charlotte Corday (1793) assassination of Jean-Paul Marat
 Leon Czolgosz (1901) assassination of US President William McKinley
 Madan Lal Dhingra (1909) assassination of William Hutt Curzon Wyllie
 Albert Dovecar (1962) assassination of Police Commissaire Roger Gavoury
 Reginald Dunne (1922) assassination of Field Marshal Sir Henry Wilson
 Muhammad abd-al-Salam Faraj (1982) assassination of Egyptian President Anwar Sadat
 John Felton (1628) assassination of George Villiers, 1st Duke of Buckingham
 Vasily Generalov (1887) conspiracy to assassinate Aleksandr III
 Sadegh Ghotbzadeh, (1982) conspiracy to assassinate Iranian Supreme Leader Ayatollah Khomeini
 Nathuram Godse (1949) assassination of Mahatma Gandhi
 Paul Gorguloff (1932) assassination of French President Paul Doumer
 Charles Guiteau (1882) assassination of US President James A. Garfield
 Abdul Khaliq Hazara (1933) assassination of Afghan King Mohammed Nadir Shah
 Eliyahu Hakim (1945) assassination of Lord Moyne
 David Herold (1865) assassination of Abraham Lincoln
 Khalid al-Islambouli (1982) assassination of Anwar Sadat
 Ivan Kalyayev (1905) assassination of Grand Duke Sergei Alexandrovich of Russia
 Lev Kamenev (1935) assassination of Sergei Kirov
 Anant Laxman Kanhere (1909) assassination of Collector A. M. T. Jackson
 Leonid Kannegisser (1918) assassination of Moisei Uritsky
 Fanni Kaplan (1918) attempted assassination of Vladimir Lenin
 Mirza Reza Kermani (1896) assassination of Iranian Shah Naser al-Din Shah Qajar
 Nikolai Kibalchich (1881) assassination of Russian Emperor Aleksandr II
 Aleksandr Kvyatkovsky (1880) conspiracy to assassinate Aleksandr II
 Kim Jae-gyu (1980) assassination of South Korean President Park Chung-hee
 Vsevolod Lebedintsev (1908) conspiracy to assassinate Russian Minister of Justice Ivan Shcheglovitov
 Roderigo Lopez (1595) attempted assassination of Queen Elizabeth I of England
 Louis Pierre Louvel (1820) assassination of Charles Ferdinand, Duke of Berry
 Naseeruddin Mauzi (1920) assassination of Robert William Douglas Willoughby
 Hafız Mehmet (1926) conspiracy to assassinate Mustafa Kemal Pasha
 Timofey Mikhailov (1881) assassination of Aleksandr II
 Rajnarayan Mishra (1944) assassination of Robert William Douglas Willoughby
 Faisal bin Musaid Al Saud (1975) assassination of king Faisal of Saudi Arabia
 Leonid Nikolaev (1934) assassination of Sergei Kirov
 Eligiusz Niewiadomski (1923) assassination of Polish President Gabriel Narutowicz
 Felice Orsini (1858) attempted assassination of Emperor of the French Napoleon III
 Vasili Osipanov (1887) conspiracy to assassinate Aleksandr III
 Joseph O'Sullivan (1922) assassination of Sir Henry Wilson
 Rüştü Pasha (1926) conspiracy to assassinate Mustafa Kemal Pasha
 Sophia Perovskaya (1881) assassination of Aleksandr II
 Peter, son of Töre (1198) assassination of Gertrude of Merania
 Claude Piegts (1962) assassination of Roger Gavoury
 Michael Piekarski (1620) attempted assassination of King Sigismund III
 Otto Planetta (1934) assassination of Austrian Chancellor Engelbert Dollfuss
 Lewis Powell (1865) conspiracy to assassinate Abraham Lincoln and attempted assassination of US Secretary of State William Seward
 Sayyid Qutb (1966) conspiracy to assassinate Egyptian President Gamal Abdel Nasser
 François Ravaillac (1610) assassination of King Henry IV of France
 Nikolai Rysakov (1881) assassination of Aleksandr II
 Petr Shevyrev (1887) conspiracy to assassinate Aleksandr III
 Beant Singh (1989) assassination of Indian Prime Minister Indira Gandhi
 Kehar Singh (1989) assassination of Indira Gandhi
 Satwant Singh (1989) assassination of Indira Gandhi
 Udham Singh (1940) assassination of Michael O'Dwyer
 Friedrich Staps (1809) attempted assassination of Emperor Napoleon
 Khalil Tahmasebi (1955) assassination of Iranian Prime Minister Ali Razmara
 William Thomas (1554) conspiracy to assassinate Queen Mary I of England
 U Saw (1948) assassination of Aung San
 Harikishan Talwar (1931) attempted assassination of Sir Geoffrey de Montmorency
 Nguyen Van Troi (1964) attempted assassination of Robert McNamara and future ambassador Henry Cabot Lodge, Jr.
 Mary Surratt (1865) assassination of Abraham Lincoln
 Aleksandr Ulyanov (1887) conspiracy to assassinate Aleksandr III
 Auguste Vaillant (1894) attempted assassination of members of the French Chamber of Deputies
 Huang Yiguang (1940) attempted assassination of Wang Jingwei
 Giuseppe Zangara (1933) assassination of Chicago mayor Anton Cermak
 Andrei Zhelyabov (1881) assassination of Aleksandr II

Espionage
 Jack Agazarian (1945)
 James J. Andrews (1862)
 Yolande Beekman (1944)
 Robert Benoist (1944) and sabotage
 Denise Bloch (1945)
 Carl Hans Lody (1914)
 Guy Biéler (1944) and sabotage
 Carmelo Borg Pisani (1942)
 Andrée Borrel (1944) and sabotage
 Madeleine Damerment (1944) and sabotage
 Sasha Fillipov (1942)
 William Grover-Williams (1945) and sabotage
 Nathan Hale (1776)
 Mata Hari (1917)
 Noor Inyat Khan (1944)
 Josef Jakobs (1941)
 Cecily Lefort (1945)
 Vera Leigh (1944)
 John Kenneth Macalister (1944)
 Karl Heinrich Meier (1940)
 Gilbert Norman (1944)
 Sonia Olschanezky (1944)
 John Pendlebury (1941)
 Frank Pickersgill (1944)
 Eliane Plewman (1944) and sabotage
 Richard Quirin (d, 1942) and sabotage
 Karel Richard Richter (1941)
 Lilian Rolfe (1945) and sabotage
 Diana Rowden (1944) and sabotage
 Yvonne Rudelatt (1945) and sabotage
 Roméo Sabourin (1944) and sabotage
 Suzanne Spaak (1944)
 Violette Szabo (1945) and sabotage
 Hannah Szenes (1944) and sabotage
 Josef Waldberg (1940)

Military and civil conflicts, insurrections, and coups d'état

Ancient Times (pre AD 500)
 Demetrius (330 BC)
 Panyassis (454 BC)
 Cleopatra Selene of Syria (69 BC)
 Longinus of Selinus (498)

Pre-Modern Era (500-1500)
 Conradin (1268)
 Constantine I of Georgia (1412)
 Dafydd ap Gruffydd (1283)
 Wen Tianxiang (1283)
 David of Trebizond (1463)
 William Wallace (1305)

Early Modern Era (1500-1800)
 Marie Antoinette (1793)
 Madame du Barry (1793)
 Micaela Bastidas (1781)
 Ștefan Cantacuzino (1716)
 King Charles I of England, Scotland, and Ireland (1649)
 Cuauhtémoc (1525)
 Daskalogiannis (1771)
 Madame Elisabeth (1793)
 György Dózsa (1514)
 Jean-Michel Duroy (1795)
 Kryštof Harant (1621)
 Wijard Jelckama (1523)
 Matthew Keogh (1798)
 Jan Sladký Kozina (1695)
 King Louis XVI of France (1793)
 Jacques Vincent Ogé (1791)
 Johan van Oldenbarnevelt (1619)
 Jöran Persson (1568)
 Maximilien Robespierre (1794)
 Crown Prince Sado (1762)
 Louis Antoine de Saint-Just (1794)
 Tiradentes (1792)
 Dun Mikiel Xerri (1799)

19th century
 Abushiri (1889)
 Federico Fernández Cavada (1871)
 Athanasios Diakos (1821)
 Tsanko Dyustabanov (1876)
 Robert Emmet (1803)
 Charles Hindelang (1839)
 Andreas Hofer (1810)
 Agustín de Iturbide (1823)
 Georgi Izmirliev (1876)
 Hermann Jellinek (1848)
 Peer Ali Khan (1857)
 François-Marie-Thomas Chevalier de Lorimier (1839)
 Muhammad Ali Madali (1898)
 Maximilian of Mexico (1867)
 Miguel Miramón (1867)
 Francisco Morazán (1842)
 Joachim Murat (1815)
 Bhima Nayak (1876)
 Hassan bin Omari (1895)
 Gabriel Prosser (1800)
 Mateo Pumacahua (1815)
 José Rizal (1896)
 Thomas Russell (1803)
 Ram Baksh Singh (1857)
 Hong Tianguifu (1864)
 William Walker (1860)
 Henry Wirz (1865)

1900s
 Peter Handcock (1902)
 Harry "Breaker" Morant (1902)
 Gideon Scheepers (1902)

1910s
 Mehmed Kemâl Bey (1919)
 Éamonn Ceannt (1916)
 Con Colbert (1916)
 James Connolly (1916)
 Thomas Clarke (1916)
 Edward Daly (1916)
 Seán Heuston (1916)
 Eugen Leviné (1919)
 John MacBride (1916)
 Seán Mac Diarmada (1916)
 Thomas MacDonagh (1916)
 Michael Mallin (1916)
 Nicholas II and family (1918)
 Michael O'Hanrahan (1916) 
 Patrick Pearse (1916) 
 William Pearse (1916)
 Joseph Plunkett (1916)
 Pavel Poltoratskiy (1918)

1920s
 Kevin Barry (1920)
 Vue Pa Chay (1921)
 Hasan Hayri (1925)
 Aleksandr Kolchak (1920)
 Maurice Moore (1921)
 Sheikh Said (1925)

1930s
 Ibrahim Bek (1931)
 Tarakeswar Dastidar (1934)
 Amada García (1938)
 Umar al-Mukhtar (1931)
 Seyid Riza (1937)
 Surya Sen (1934)
 Lý Tự Trọng (1931)

1940s
 Ion Antonescu (1946)
 Eugen Bolz (1945)
 Kurt Daluege (1946)
 Alois Eliáš (1942)
 Bogdan Filov (1945)
 Hans Frank (1946)
 Wilhelm Frick (1946)
 Amon Göth (1946)
 Arthur Greiser (1946)
 Irma Grese (1945)
 Alfred Jodl (1946)
 Ernst Kaltenbrunner (1946)
 Wilhelm Keitel (1946)
 Komarudin (1949)
 Pierre Laval (1945)
 Draža Mihailović (1946)
 Arndt Pekurinen (1944)
 Vidkun Quisling (1945)
 Joachim von Ribbentrop (1946)
 Alfred Rosenberg (1946)
 Fritz Sauckel (1946)
 Arthur Seyss-Inquart (1946)
 Eddie Slovik (1945)
 Julius Streicher (1946)
 Ferenc Szálasi (1946)
 Jozef Tiso (1947)
 Hideki Tōjō (1948)
 Tomoyuki Yamashita (1946)

1950s
 King Faisal II of Iraq (1958)
 Dedan Kimathi (1957)
 Moshe Marzouk (1955)
 Larbi Ben M'hidi (1957)
 Imre Nagy (1958)
 Evagoras Pallikarides (1957)

1960s
 Adolf Eichmann (1962)
 Ernesto Guevara (1967)
 Évariste Kimba (1966)
 Patrice Lumumba (1961)
 Adnan Menderes (1961)
 Hasan Polatkan (1961)
 Chris Soumokil (1966)
 Fatin Rüştü Zorlu (1961)

1970s
 Ignatius Kutu Acheamphong (1979)
 Salim Rubai Ali (1978)
 Akwasi Afrifa (1979)
 Fred Akuffo (1979)
 Zulfikar Ali Bhutto (1979)
 Long Boret (1975)
 Francisco Caamaño (1973)
 Amir Abbas Hoveida (1979)
 Endelkachew Makonnen (1974)
 Alphonse Massamba-Débat (1977)
 Sisowath Sirik Matak (1975)
 Francisco Macías Nguema (1979)

1980s
 Hameed Baloch (1981)
 Maurice Bishop (1983)
 Elena Ceaușescu (1989)
 Nicolae Ceaușescu (1989)
 Diarra Traoré (1985)
 Henri Zongo (1989)

Post 1990
 Saddam Hussein (2006)
 Ahmad Ibrahim al-Sayyid al-Naggar (2000)
 Tal'at Fu'ad Qasim (1995)

Murder
 Jack Alderman (2008)
 Peter Anthony Allen (1964) one of the last two executions in the UK
 Johan Alfred Ander (1910) last execution in Sweden
 James Arcene (1885) and robbery
 Ahmad Najib Aris (2016)
 Herbert Rowse Armstrong (1922)
 Hesham Ashmawy (2020)
 Hıdır Aslan (1984) last execution in Turkey
 Jean-Charles-Alphonse Avinain (1867)
 Manny Babbitt (1999)
 Billy Bailey (1996)
 John Battaglia (2018)
 Jereboam O. Beauchamp (1826)
 Noah Beauchamp (1842)
 Grete Beier (1908) the last woman to be publicly executed in the Kingdom of Saxony
 Derek Bentley (1953) pardoned
 Brandon Bernard (2020)
 Bhabani Prasad Bhattacharya (1935)
 Manoranjan Bhattacharya (1932) and armed robbery
 Pradyot Kumar Bhattacharya (1933)
 Kenneth Biros (2009) also rape, robbery, and sexual penetration
 Ramakrishna Biswas (1931)
 Hippolyte Visart de Bocarmé (1851)
 Charu Chandra Bose (1909)
 Khudiram Bose (1908)
 Claude Buffet (1972)
 Henry John Burnett (1963) last execution in Scotland
 Edwin Bush (1961)
 Elizabeth Butchill (1780)
 Frederick Bywaters (1923)
 Charles Campbell (1994)
 Jérôme Carrein (1977)
 Beatrice Cenci (1599)
 Brajakishore Chakraborty (1934)
 Dhananjoy Chatterjee (2004)
 Botak Chin (1981)
 Lim Chin Chong (1998)
 Pramod Ranjan Choudhury (1926)
 Styllou Christofi (1954)
 James Lee Clark (2007)
 Wilbert Coffin (1956)
 Flor Contemplación (1995)
 James Copeland (1857)
 James Corbitt (1950)
 Dr. Hawley Harvey Crippen (1910)
 Ba Cụt (1956)
 John Dickman (1910)
 Hamida Djandoubi (1977) last execution in France
 Samuel Herbert Dougal (1903)
 Mrigendra Dutta (1933)
 Ruth Ellis (1955) last woman executed in the UK
 Gwynne Owen Evans (1964) one of the last two executions in the UK
 John Louis Evans (1983)
 Timothy Evans (1950) pardoned
 Jason Fairbanks (1801)
 Mona Fandey (2001)
 Edmond Foley (1921)
 Francis Forsyth (1960)
 Sidney Harry Fox (1930)
 Juan Garza (2001)
 Nirmal Jibon Ghosh (1934)
 Gary Gilmore (1977)
 Barbara Graham (1955)
 Oswald Grey (1962)
 Biren Datta Gupta (1910)
 Dinesh Gupta (1931)
 James Hanratty (1962)
 Bruno Hauptmann (1936)
 Frederick John Harris (1965)
 Robert Alton Harris (1992)
 Neville Heath (1946)
 Dustin Higgs (2021)
 Joe Hill (1915)
 Paul Jennings Hill (2003)
 Walter Horsford (1898)
 Took Leng How (2006)
 James Inglis (1951)
 Paul Irniger (1939)
 Kho Jabing (2016)
 Juliana (ca. 1542)
 Michalis Karaolis (1956)
 İbrahim Kaypakkaya (1973)
 Ned Kelly (1880) and armed robbery
 William Kemmler (1890)
 Thomas Kent (1916)
 Charles Kerins (1944)
 Karl-Otto Koch (1945)
 François Claudius Koenigstein (1892)
 Pierre François Lacenaire (1836)
 LaGrand brothers (2001) and armed robbery
 Lela Pandak Lam (1877)
 Antoine Léger (1824)
 Teresa Lewis (2010)
 José Gregorio Liendo (1973) also robbery and rape
 Adrian Lim (1988) notorious child killer in Singapore
 Raymond Lisenba (1942) last execution by hanging in California
 Arthur Lucas (1962) one of the last two executions in Canada
 Patrick Maher (1921)
 Solomon Mahlangu (1979)
 Mahsuri (1819)
 Mampuru II (1883)
 Michael Manning (1954) last execution in the Republic of Ireland
 Mahmood Hussein Mattan (1952) pardoned
 Robert McGladdery (1961) last execution in Northern Ireland
 Daisy de Melker (1932)
 Louisa May Merrifield (1953)
 Anthony Miller (1960) last teenager executed in the UK
 Anantahari Mitra (1926)
 Benjamin Moloise (1985)
 Thomas Hartley Montgomery (1873) only Irish policeman sentenced to death for murder
 Patrick Moran (1921)
 Shukri Mustafa (1978)
 Mun Se-gwang (1974)
 Hester Rebecca Nepping (1812)
 Susan Newell (1923) last woman executed in Scotland
 Solomon Ngobeni (1989) last execution in South Africa
 Anath Bondhu Panja (1933)
 Zsiga Pankotia (1961)
 Russell Pascoe (1963)
 Harry Pierpont (1934)
 Guenther Podola (1959) last execution in the UK for the murder of a policeman
 Victor Prévost (1880)
 Christian Ranucci (1976)
 Joseph Riaud (1876)
 Alfred Rouse (1931)
 Ramkrishna Roy (1934)
 Buck Ruxton (1936)
 Sacco and Vanzetti (1927)
 Gopinath Saha (1924)
 August Sangret (1943)
 Utuwankande Sura Saradiel (1864) and armed robbery
 Richard Schuh (1949)
 Frederick Seddon (1912)
 Laurence Shirley, 4th Earl Ferrers (1760)
 Baikuntha Shukla (1934)
 Roshan Singh (1927)
 Bhagat Singh (1931)
 Sukhdev (1931)
 Shivaram Rajguru (1931)
 Ahmad Isma'il 'Uthman Saleh (2000)
 Võ Thị Sáu (1952)
 Boysie Singh (1957)
 James Smith (1962)
 Sandra Smith (1989) last woman executed in South Africa
 John Frederick Stockwell (1934)
 Edith Thompson (1923)
 Norman Thorne (1925)
 Thomas Traynor (1921)
 Karla Faye Tucker (1998)
 Ronald Turpin (1962) one of the last two executions in Canada
 Hans Vollenweider (1940) last execution in Switzerland by guillotine
 Berthold Wehmeyer (1949)
 Thomas Whelan (1921)
 Jerry White (1995)
 Alfred Charles Whiteway (1953)
 Dennis Whitty (1963)
 Thomas Williams (1942)
 Rhoda Willis (1907) last woman executed in Wales
 Edmund Zagorski (2018)

Mass murder
 Floyd Allen (1913)
 Ali Amrozi bin Haji Nurhasyim (2008)
 Fritz Angerstein (1925)
 Annice (1828)
 Shoko Asahara (2018)
 Bai Ningyang (2006)
 Peter Barnes (1940)
 Michael Barrett (1868) last public execution in the UK
 Bangla Bhai (2007)
 Dominick Bodkin (1740)
 Bernard Bolender (1995)
 Vernon Booher (1929)
 Lester Bower (2015)
 Earl Bramblett (2003)
 Richard Burgess (1866)
 Abel Clemmons (1806)
 Robert Raymond Cook (1960)
 William Cook (1952)
 Manuel Martínez Coronado (1998)
 Ditbardh and Josef Cuko (1992)
 Frederick Bailey Deeming (1892)
 Marion Butler Dudley (2006)
 Seiichi Endo (2018)
 Samuel Ferguson (1865)
 Giuseppe Marco Fieschi (1836)
 James Governor (1901)
 Jack Gilbert Graham (1957)
 Joseph-Albert Guay (1951)
 Joseph Hamilton (1906)
 Robert Wayne Harris (2012)
 George Hassell (1928)
 Olga Hepnarová (1975)
 Richard Hickock (1965)
 Kenichi Hirose (2018)
 Daniel Hittle (2000)
 Daryl Holton (2007)
 Dustin Honken (2020)
 Hsu Tung-chih (1984)
 Huda bin Abdul Haq (2008)
 Yoshihiro Inoue (2018)
 Jin Ruchao (2001)
 Steven Timothy Judy (1981)
 Ajmal Kasab (2012)
 Marcin Kasprzak (1905)
 Toivo Koljonen (1943)
 James Lammers (1952)
 John D. Lee (1877)
 Vladimír Lulek (1989)
 Jeffrey Lundgren (2006)
 Vassilis Lymberis (1972) last person executed in Greece
 Ma Jiajue (2004)
 Wiremu Kīngi Maketū (1842)
 Luis Monge (1967)
 James McCormick (1940)
 Timothy McVeigh (2001)
 Anatoly Nagiyev (1981)
 Mohammad Ahman al-Naziri (1997)
 Jay Wesley Neill (2002)
 Tomomitsu Niimi (2018)
 John Filip Nordlund (1900) last execution by axe in Sweden
 Kazuaki Okazaki (2018)
 Carl Panzram (1930)
 Marguerite Pitre (1953)
 Gilbert Postelle (2022)
 Saeed al-Qashash (1999)
 Giannis and Thymios Retzos (1930)
 Généreux Ruest (1952)
 Imam Samudra (2008)
 Shi Yuejun (2008)
 Andrey Shpagonov (1995)
 George David Silva (1912)
 Ronald Gene Simmons (1990)
 Clay King Smith (2001)
 Perry Smith (1965)
 Roger Dale Stafford (1995)
 Mamoru Takuma (2004)
 Abraham Thomas (1958)
 Masami Tsuchiya (2018)
 Wang Binyu (2005)
 Wang Xiwen (1981)
 Coy Wayne Wesbrook (2016)
 William James Williams (2005)
 Hastings Arthur Wise (2005)
 Yan Yanming (2005)
 Yang Jia (2008)
 Yang Zanyun (2019)
 Thomas Young (1959)
 Andrew Zondo (1986)

Serial killers
 Frank Abbandando (1942) contract killer
 Zaven Almazyan (1973) known as "the Voroshilovgrad Maniac"
 Diogo Alves (1841) known as "the Aqueduct Murderer"
 Klaas Annink (1775) known as "Huttenkloas"
 Stephen Wayne Anderson (2002)
 Martha Beck (1951) known as one of the "Lonely Hearts Killers"
 Oleksandr Berlizov (1972) known as "the Night Demon"
 Mohammed Bijeh (2005) known as "the Vampire of the Tehran Desert"
 Jake Bird (1949) known as "the Tacoma Axe Murderer"
 William Bonin (1996)
 Gary Ray Bowles (2019)
 Judy Buenoano (1998) known as "the Black Widow"
 Ted Bundy (1989)
 Frank Carter (1927) known as "the Phantom Sniper"
 Augustine Chacon (1902) known as "the Hairy One"
 Oba Chandler (2011)
 George Chapman (1903)
 Gao Chengyong (2019) known as "the Gansu Ripper"
 The Chijon family (1995) a South Korean gang
 Andrei Chikatilo (1994) known as "the Butcher of Rostov"
 John Christie (1953)
 Eric Edgar Cooke (1964) known as "the Night Caller"
 Thomas Neill Cream (1892) known as "the Lambeth Poisoner"
 Gordon Cummins (1942) known as "the Blackout Ripper"
 Sarah Dazley (1843) known as "the Potton Poisoner"
 Williamina "Minnie" Dean (1895) only woman executed in New Zealand
 Martin Dumollard (1862) known as "the Monster of Montluel"
 Theodore Durrant (1898) known as "the Demon in the Belfry"
 Amelia Dyer (1896) known as "the Ogress of Reading"
 Raymond Fernandez (1951) known as one of the "Lonely Hearts Killers"
 Albert Fish (1936) known as "the Brooklyn Vampire"
 Joseph Paul Franklin (2013)
 John Wayne Gacy (1994) known as "the Killer Clown"
 Gilles Garnier (1573) known as "the Werewolf of Dole"
 Carlton Gary (2018) known as "the Stocking Strangler"
 Donald Henry Gaskins (1991) known as "the Redneck Charles Manson"
 Harvey Glatman (1959) known as "the Glamour Girl Slayer"
 Sergey Golovkin (1996) known as "the Boa", last execution in Russia
 Fritz Haarmann (1925) known as "the Butcher of Hanover"
 John George Haigh (1949) known as "the Acid Bath Murderer"
 Saeed Hanaei (2002) known as "the Spider Killer"
 William Henry Hance (1994) known as "the Force of Evil"
 Robert Dale Henderson (1993)
 H. H. Holmes (1896)
 Yuri Ivanov (1989) known as "the Ust-Kamenogorsk Maniac"
 Thomas Jeffrey (1826) known as "Jeffries the Monster"
 Hélène Jégado (1852)
 John Joubert (1996) known as "the Woodford Slasher"
 Willi Kimmritz (1950) perpetrator of the "Horror of the Brandenburg Forest" murders
 Yoshio Kodaira (1949) known as "the Japanese Bluebeard"
 Vasili Komaroff (1923) known as "the Wolf of Moscow"
 Peter Kürten (1931) known as "the Vampire of Düsseldorf"
 Henri Désiré Landru (1922) known as "the Bluebeard of Gambais"
 Eddie Leonski (1942) known as "the Brownout Strangler"
 Gamal Lineveldt (1941)
 Robert Joseph "Bobby Joe" Long (2019) known as "the Adman Rapist"
 John Lynch (1842) known as "the Berrima Axe Murderer"
 Hiroshi Maeue (2009) known as "the Suicide Website Murderer"
 Ramadan Abdel Rehim Mansour (2010)
 Peter Manuel (1958) known as "the Beast of Birkenshaw"
 Saad Iskandar Abdel Masih (1953)
 Vladislav Mazurkievitz (1957) known as "the Gentleman Killer"
 Daisy de Melker (1932)
 Igor Mirenkov (1996) perpetrator of the "Svetlogorsk Nightmare" murders
 Tsutomu Miyazaki (2008) known as "the Otaku Murderer"
 Stanislav Modzelevski (1969) known as "the Vampire of Galkovek"
 Catherine Montvoisin (1680) known as "La Voisin"
 Elifasi Msomi (1956)
 Seisaku Nakamura (1943) known as "the Hamamatsu Deaf Killer"
 Earle Nelson (1928) known as "the Dark Strangler"
 Robert Nixon (1939) known as "Brick Moron"
 Gordon Stewart Northcott (1930) known as "the Ape Man"
 Paul Ogorzow (1941) known as "the S-Bahn Murderer"
 Manuel "Manny" Pardo (2012)
 Steven Brian Pennell (1992) known as "the Route 40 Killer"
 Marcel Petiot (1946)
 Thomas W. Piper (1876) known as "the Boston Belfry Murderer"
 Harry Powers (1932) known as "the Bluebeard of West Virginia"
 Marion Albert Pruett (1999) known as "the Mad Dog"
 Gilles de Rais (1440) known as "Bluebeard"
 Ángel Maturino Reséndiz (2006) known as "the Railroad Killer"
 Stephen D. Richards (1879) known as "the Nebraska Fiend", first execution in the State of Nebraska
 Ion Rîmaru (1971) known as "the Vampire of Bucharest"
 Daniel Rolling (2006) known as "the Gainesville Ripper"
 Edward H. Rulloff (1871) known as "the Educated Killer"
 Raya and Sakina (1920)
 Tommy Lynn Sells (2014)
 Abdullah Shah (2004) known as "Zardad's Dog"
 Simicoudza Simicourba (1911)
 Vasily Smirnov (1980) known as "the Gatchina Psychopath"
 George Joseph Smith (1915) perpetrator of the "Brides in the Bath" murders
 Arnold Sodeman (1936) known as "the Schoolgirl Strangler"
 Timothy Wilson Spencer (1994) known as "the Southside Strangler"
 Charles Starkweather (1959)
 Vladimir Storozhenko (1982) known as "the Smolensk Strangler"
 Peter Stumpp (1589) known as "the Werewolf of Bedburg"
 François Tomasini (1914)
 Jean-Baptiste Troppmann (1870) known as "the Human Tiger"
 Joseph Vacher (1898) known as "the French Ripper"
 Sek Kim Wah (1988) Singapore's first serial killer
 Eugen Weidmann (1939) last public execution in France
 John Allen Williams known as "the Beltway Sniper"
 Stanley Williams (2005)
 Aileen Wuornos (2002)
 Elias Xitavhudzi (1960) known as "the Pangaman"
 Yang Xinhai (2004) known as "the Monster Killer"

Piracy
 José Joaquim Almeida (1832)
 Peter Alston (1804)
 John Auger (1718)
 Joseph Baker (1800)
 Joseph Bannister (1687)
 Eli Boggs (1861)
 Stede Bonnet (1718)
 Satyendranath Bosu (1908)
 Joseph Bradish (1700)
 Nicolas Brigaut (1686)
 James Browne (1677)
 Roberto Cofresí (1825)
 Jacques Colaert (1600)
 Richard Coyle (1738)
 Mary Critchett (1729)
 Alexander Dalzeel (1715)
 Robert Deal (1721)
 Kanailal Dutta (1908)
 Alv Erlingsson (1290)
 John Fenn (1723)
 William Fly (1726)
 Charles Gibbs (1831)
 Pedro Gilbert (1835)
 John Golden (1694)
 Nathaniel Gordon (1862)
 John Gow (1725)
 Thomas Green (1705)
 Jean Baptiste Guedry (1726)
 Louis Guittar (1700)
 Charles Harris (1723)
 Klein Henszlein (1573)
 David Herriot (1718)
 Albert W. Hicks (1860)
 Hendrick van Hoven (1699)
 Calico Jack (1720)
 Daniel Johnson (1675)
 Peter Johnson (1672)
 Edward Jordan (1809)
 John Julian (1733)
 William Kidd (1701)
 James Kelly (1701)
 Walter Kennedy (1721)
 Olivier Levasseur (1730)
 Narciso López (1851)
 Peter Love (1610)
 Matthew Luke (1722)
 Philip Lyne (1726)
 Simon Mascarino (1721)
 Samuel Mason (1803)
 Gottfried Michaelsen (1402)
 Christopher Moody (1722)
 Duncan Mackintosh (1689)
 Jan Mendoses (1615)
 Andrea Morisco (1308)
 Pedro Ñancúpel (1888)
 John Oxenham (1580)
 Cabeza de Perro (18??)
 John Prie (1727)
 John Quelch (1704)
 Walter Raleigh (1618)
 Stenka Razin (1671)
 Philip Roche (1723)
 James Skyrme (1722)
 Gustav Skytte (1663)
 Benito de Soto (1830)
 Filippo di Piero Strozzi (1582)
 Thomas Sutton (1722)
 Jacques Tavernier (1673)
 Joseph Thompson (1719)
 Jean Tristan (1693)
 Charles Vane (1721)
 Thomas Vaughan (1696)
 Rachel Wall (1789) last woman executed in Massachusetts
 Hennig Wichmann (1402)
 Magister Wigbold (1401)
 Nicholas Woodall (1718)
 Wang Zhi (1560)
 Chen Zuyi (1407)

Political opponents
 Friedrich Akel (1941)
 Marie Bouffa (1945)
 Jacques Pierre Brissot (1793)
 André Chénier (1794)
 Galeazzo Ciano (1944)
 Vladimír Clementis (1952)
 Corneliu Zelea Codreanu (1938)
 Georges Danton (1794)
 Camille Desmoulins (1794)
 Olympe de Gouges (1793)
 İskilipli Mehmed Atıf Hoca (1926)
 Jüri Jaakson (1942)
 Bronislav Kaminski (1944)
 Michael Kitzelmann (1942)
 Traicho Kostov (1949)
 William Laud (1645) and treason
 Antoine Lavoisier (1794)
 Antonio Llidó (1974)
 William Alexander Morgan (1961)
 Ippolit Myshkin (1885)
 Lucreţiu Pătrăşcanu (1954)
 Viktor Pepelyayev (1920)
 Nikola Petkov (1947)
 Margaret Pole, Countess of Salisbury (1541)
 László Rajk (1949)
 Madame Roland (1793)
 Martemyan Ryutin (1927)
 Ken Saro-Wiwa (1995)
 Ivan Shcheglovitov (1918)
 Hans Scholl (1943)
 Sophie Scholl (1943)
 Alexander Schmorell (1943)
 Mohammad Musa Shafiq (1979)
 Amir Sjarifuddin (1948)
 Rudolf Slánský (1952)
 José Calvo Sotelo (1936)
 Koçi Xoxe (1949)
 Tsehafi Taezaz Aklilu Habte-Wold (1974)
 Yusuf Salman Yusuf (1949)

Political purges

Executed during the Night of the Long Knives (all in 1934)
 Otto Ballerstedt
 Herbert von Bose
 Karl Ernst
 Fritz Gerlich
 Karl-Günther Heimsoth
 Edmund Heines
 Peter von Heydebreck
 Anton von Hohberg und Buchwald
 Edgar Jung
 Gustav Ritter von Kahr
 Erich Klausener
 Adalbert Probst
 Ernst Röhm
 Kurt von Schleicher
 Emil Sembach
 Bernhard Stempfle
 Gregor Strasser

Executed during the Great Purge
 Alexander Abramov-Mirov (1937)
 Valentine Adler (1942)
 Maksim Ammosov (1938)
 Zigmas Angarietis (1940)
 Ecaterina Arbore (1937)
 Sanjar Asfendiyarov (1938)
 Urunboi Ashurov (1938)
 Kaikhaziz Atabayev (1938)
 Nedirbay Aytakov (1938)
 Isaac Babel (1940)
 Ivan Bakayev (1936)
 Alexey Bakulin (1939)
 Mikhail Batorsky (1938)
 Alexander Beloborodov (1938)
 Boris Berman (1939)
 Matvei Berman (1939)
 Konon Berman-Yurin (1936)
 Sergei Bessonov (1941)
 Anastasia Bitsenko (1938)
 Waclaw Bogucki (1937)
 Vladimir Bogushevsky (1939)
 Mikhail Boguslavsky (1937)
 Oskar Böhme (1938)
 Georgy Bondar (1939)
 Volf Bronner (1939)
 Andrei Bubnov (1938)
 Gavril Buciușcan (1937)
 Nikolay Bukharin (1938)
 Pavel Bulanov (1938)
 Samson Chanba (1937)
 Virendranath Chattopadhyaya (1937)
 Mikhail Chernov (1938)
 Vlas Chubar (1939)
 Rose Cohen (1937)
 Vladimir Ćopić (1939)
 Nikolay Dobrokhotov (1938)
 Yakov Drobnis (1937)
 Ehsanollah Khan Dustdar (1939)
 Sholom Dvolajckij (1937)
 Roberts Eidemanis (1937)
 Robert Eikhe (1940)
 Efrem Eshba (1939)
 Boris Feldman (1937)
 Abdurauf Fitrat (1938)
 George Fles (1939)
 Leo Flieg (1939)
 Lovett Fort-Whiteman (1939)
 Mikhail Frinovsky (1940)
 Aleksei Gastev (1939)
 Grigori Grinko (1938)
 Abraham Guloyan (1937)
 Abdurrahim Hojibayev (1933)
 Akmal Ikramov (1938)
 Vladimir Ivanov (1938)
 Abdullah Kadiri (1938)
 Karl Kahl (1938)
 Boris Kamkov (1937)
 Lev Karakhan (1937)
 Grigory Khakhanyan (1939)
 Karim Khakimov (1938)
 Aghasi Khanjian (1936)
 Fayzulla Khodzhayev (1938)
 Lazar Kogan (1939)
 Mikhail Koltsov (1940)
 August Kork (1937)
 Boris Kornilov (1938)
 Aleksandr Kosarev (1939)
 Stanisław Kosior (1939)
 Nikolai Krestinsky (1938)
 Pyotr Kryuchkov (1938)
 Béla Kun (1938)
 Sariya Lakoba (1936)
 Samuil Lehtțir (1937)
 Lev Levin (1938)
 Solomon Levit (1938)
 Ghulam Ambia Khan Lohani (1938)
 Nusratullo Maksum (1937)
 Vsevolod Meyerhold (1940)
 Levon Mirzoyan (1939)
 Nikolay Matorin (1936)
 Sergei Mrachkovsky (1936)
 Anna Mukhamedov (1938)
 Abani Mukherjee (1937)
 Nikolay Muralov (1937)
 Nikolai Vissarionovich Nekrasov (1940)
 Osip Piatnitsky (1938)
 Boris Pinson (1936)
 Fritz Platten (1942)
 Dmitry Pletnyov (1941)
 Pavel Postyshev (1939)
 Boris Pozern (1939)
 Yevgeni Preobrazhensky (1937)
 Vitaly Primakov (1937)
 Vitovt Putna (1937)
 Georgy Pyatakov (1937)
 Karl Radek (1939)
 Abdullo Rakhimbayev (1938)
 Christian Rakovsky (1941)
 Nikolay Rattel (1939)
 Mark Rein (1937)
 Hermann Remmele (1939)
 Barbora Rezlerová-Švarcová (1941)
 Arkady Rosengolts (1938)
 Aleksey Rykov (1938)
 Timofei Sapronov (1937)
 Murat Salihov (1938)
 Rudolf Samoylovich (1939)
 Filimon Săteanu (1937)
 Leonid Serebryakov (1937)
 Dmitry Shakhovskoy (1939)
 Vasily Sharangovich (1938)
 Alexander Shliapnikov (1937)
 Shirinsho Shotemur (1937)
 Alexander Shotman (1937)
 Ivar Smilga (1938)
 Aleksandr Petrovich Smirnov (1938)
 Ivan Smirnov (1936)
 Vladimir Smirnov (1937)
 Pyotr Smorodin (1939)
 Jan Sten (1937)
 Boris Stomonyakov (1940)
 Mirsaid Sultan-Galiev (1940)
 Avetis Sultan-Zade (1938)
 Béla Székely (1939)
 Vagarshak Ter-Vaganyan (1936)
 Boris Tolpygo (1939)
 Mikhail Trilisser (1940)
 Vladimir Tsyganko (1938)
 Kasym Tynystanov (1938)
 Ieronim Uborevich (1937)
 Nikolai Uglanov (1937)
 Abdukadyr Urazbekov (1938)
 Zinovy Ushakov (1940)
 Aleksandr Uspensky (1940)
 Iosif Vareikis (1938)
 Nikolai Efimovich Varfolomeev (1939)
 Mikhail Vasilyev-Yuzhin (1937)
 Ivan Voronaev 9d. 1937)
 Alexei Voshchakin (1937)
 Gaspar Voskanyan (1937)
 Genrikh Yagoda (1938)
 Iona Yakir (1937)
 Varvara Yakovleva (1941)
 Victor Yartsev (1940)
 Grigory Yevdokimov (1936)
 Yu Xiusong (1939)
 Aleksandr Yegorov (1939)
 Yefim Yevdokimov (1940)
 Nikolai Yezhov (1940)
 Abdulhamid Yunusov (1938)
 Pyotr Zalutsky (1937)
 Isaak Zelensky (1938)
 Berthe Zimmermann (1937)
 Grigory Zinoviev (1936)
 Dimitar Zlatarev (1937)
 Prokopy Zubarev (1938)

Executed members of the 20 July plot
 Ludwig Beck (1944)
 Robert Bernardis (1944)
 Albrecht Graf von Bernstorff (1945)
 Hasso von Boehmer (1945)
 Eugen Bolz (1945)
 Dietrich Bonhoeffer (1945)
 Klaus Bonhoeffer (1945)
 Hans-Jürgen von Blumenthal (1944)
 Eduard Brücklmeier (1944)
 Wilhelm Canaris (1945)
 Walter Cramer (1944)
 Alfred Delp (1945)
 Heinrich zu Dohna-Schlobitten (1944)
 Hans von Dohnanyi (1945)
 Erich Fellgiebel (1944)
 Eberhard Finckh (1944)
 Reinhold Frank (1945)
 Friedrich Fromm (1945)
 Wessel Freytag von Loringhoven (1944)
 Ludwig Gehre (1945)
 Elisabeth and Erich Gloeden (1944)
 Carl Friedrich Goerdeler (1945)
 Fritz Goerdeler (1945)
 Nikolaus Gross (1945)
 Karl Ludwig Freiherr von und zu Guttenberg (1945)
 Hans Bernd von Haeften (1944)
 Werner von Haeften (1944)
 Albrecht von Hagen (1944)
 Nikolaus von Halem (1944)
 Georg Hansen (1944)
 Ernst von Harnack (1945)
 Paul von Hase (1944)
 Ulrich von Hassell (1944)
 Theodor Haubach (1945)
 Albrecht Haushofer (1945)
 Egbert Hayessen (1944)
 Wolf-Heinrich Graf von Helldorff (1944)
 Otto Herfurth (1944)
 Erich Hoepner (1944)
 Caesar von Hofacker (1944)
 Roland von Hößlin (1944)
 Friedrich Gustav Jaeger (1944)
 Hans John (1945)
 Otto Kiep (1944)
 Hans Georg Klamroth (1944)
 Friedrich Klausing (1944)
 Ewald von Kleist-Schmenzin (1945)
 Hans Koch (1945)
 Alfred Kranzfelder (1944)
 Carl Langbehn (1944)
 Heinrich Graf von Lehndorff-Steinort (1944)
 Julius Leber (1945)
 Ludwig Freiherr von Leonrod (1944)
 Bernhard Letterhaus (1944)
 Paul Lejeune-Jung (1944)
 Franz Leuninger (1945)
 Wilhelm Leuschner (1944)
 Hans Otfried von Linstow (1944)
 Ferdinand von Lüninck (1944)
 Hermann Maaß (1944)
 Rudolf von Marogna-Redwitz (1944)
 Michael von Matuschka (1944)
 Joachim Meichssner (1944)
 Albrecht Mertz von Quirnheim (1944)
 Joseph Müller (1944)
 Arthur Nebe (1945)
 Friedrich Olbricht (1944)
 Hans Oster (1945)
 Erwin Planck (1945)
 Kurt von Plettenberg (1945)
 Johannes Popitz (1945)
 Friedrich von Rabenau (1945)
 Adolf Reichwein (1944)
 Alexis von Roenne (1944)
 Erwin Rommel (1944)
 Karl Sack (1945)
 Joachim Sadrozinski (1944)
 Anton Saefkow (1944)
 Rüdiger Schleicher (1945)
 Ernst Schneppenhorst (1945)
 Friedrich-Werner Graf von der Schulenburg (1944)
 Fritz-Dietlof von der Schulenburg (1944)
 Ludwig Schwamb (1945)
 Günther Smend (1944)
 Franz Sperr (1945)
 Berthold Schenk Graf von Stauffenberg (1944)
 Claus von Stauffenberg (1944)
 Hellmuth Stieff (1944)
 Theodor Strünck (1945)
 Carl-Heinrich von Stülpnagel (1944)
 Fritz Thiele (1944)
 Busso Thoma (1945)
 Karl Freiherr von Thüngen (1944)
 Adam von Trott zu Solz (1944)
 Nikolaus von Üxküll-Gyllenband (1944)
 Eduard Wagner (1944)
 Hermann Josef Wehrle (1944)
 Carl Wentzel (1944)
 Josef Wirmer (1944)
 Erwin von Witzleben (1944)
 Peter Yorck von Wartenburg (1944)
 Gustav Heistermann von Ziehlberg (1945)

Prisoners of war
 Alexander George Arbuthnot and Robert C. Ambrister, both hanged by Andrew Jackson (1818)
 Marc Bloch (1944)
 Emilio De Bono (1944)
 Davy Crockett (1836)
 Maximilian Kolbe (1941) volunteered himself in place of another
 Élise Rivet (1945)
 Elisabeth de Rothschild (1945)

Religious figures

 Rabbi Akiva (ca. 135 CE) religious dissident
 Avvakum (1682) religious dissent
 Saint Joan of Arc (b. 1431) supposed heresy
 Bartholomew (1st century)
 Qutubuddin Shaheed (1648) Dawoodi Bohra Dai al Mutlaq
 Giordano Bruno (1600) heresy
 Thomas Cranmer (1556) treason, heresy
 Cardinal John Fisher (1535) treason, religious dissent
 Jan Hus (b. 1415) heresy
 Jacob Hutter (1536) heresy
 Saint James the Great (44)
 Jesus of Nazareth (30, 33, or 36) sedition
 John Lambert (1538) heresy
 Hugh Latimer (1555) heresy
 Sir Thomas More (1535) treason, religious dissent
 Saint Paul (64)
 Saint Peter (64)
 Philip the Apostle (80)
 Michael Servetus (1553) heresy
 Edward Wightman (1612) heresy
 Lucilio Vanini (1619) apostasy

Robbery and theft
 Ramprasad Bismil (1927), armed robbery
 Joseph Blake (1724)
 Spence Broughton (1792)
 Johannes Bückler (1803)
 Caryl Chessman (1960), 17 counts of robbery, kidnapping, and rape
 Thomas Cox (1690)
 Isaac Darkin (1761)
 Jenny Diver (1741)
 Claude Duval (1670)
 Barbara Erni (1785), confidence trickster
 Richard Ferguson (1800)
 James Field (1751)
 James Fitzpatrick (1778)
 Eppelein von Gailingen (1381)
 Captain Gallagher (1818)
 Dimitar Obshti (1873)
 Neesy O'Haughan (1720)
 Captain Will Hollyday (1697)
 Luke Hutton (1598)
 Alexandru and Paul Ioanid (1959)
 Constantia Jones (1738)
 Thomas Edward Ketchum (1901)
 Ashfaqulla Khan (1927)
 Rajendra Lahiri (1927)
 George Lyon (1815)
 James MacLaine (1750)
 Paulus Hector Mair (1579), embezzlement of public funds
 Étienne Monier (1913)
 Orxines (323 BC)
 Ishola Oyenusi (1971) multiple counts of armed robbery and carjacking
 Robert Palin (1861)
 John Poulter (1754)
 John Rann (1774)
 Jakob "Hannikel" Reinhard (1787)
 Biswanath Sardar (1808) also arson and armed revolt
 Jack Sheppard (1724)
 Henry Simms (1747)
 Robert Snooks (1802)
 Amy Spain (1865), last female slave executed in the United States
 William Spiggot (d 1721)
 Dick Turpin (1739)
 Jane Voss (1684)
 Jonathan Wild (1725), corruption
 Ann Wyley (1777), only black person executed in Michigan

Sexual offences

Homosexuality

 Katherina Hetzeldorfer (1477), German cross dressing lesbian executed for heresy against nature after having used a dildo on two female partners. 
 John Atherton (1640), Bishop of Waterford and Lismore
 Jacopo Bonfadio (1550), Italian humanist and historian
 Francesco Calcagno (1550), Venician Franciscan friar.
 Giovanni di Giovanni (1365), 15-year-old Italian boy charged with being "a public and notorious passive sodomite"
 Lisbetha Olsdotter (1679), Swedish cross-dresser and early female soldier (disguised as a man).
 Dominique Phinot (1556), French composer of the Renaissance
 James Pratt and John Smith (1835), two London men who became the last two people executed for sodomy in the UK

Sexual assault

Rape
 Amnon (year unknown) incestual rape
 John A. Bennett (1961) and attempted murder
 Robert David Bennett (1932) last execution in Australia for a crime other than murder
 Rainey Bethea (1936) last public execution in the United States
 Jacques Chausson (1661) attempted homosexual rape of a young nobleman
 Richard Cornish (1625) homosexual rape of an endentured servant
 Carlo Fantom (1643)
 Thomas Knapton (1833)
 Martinsville Seven (1951) group of seven men convicted of gang rape
 William McGee (1951)
 Julius Morgan (1916)
 Jeremiah Reeves (1958)
 Mustapha Tabet (1993) police commissioner convicted of the kidnap and sexual assault of over 500 women, last execution in Morocco
 Mervyn Tuchet (1631) rape of his wife and homosexual relations with two of his servants

Paedophiles
 Mahmoud Asgari and Ayaz Marhoni (2005)
 Leo Echegaray (1999)
 Li Feng (2003)
 Luo Yanlin (2008)
 Ronald Wolfe (1964)

Other sex offences
 Claudine de Culam (1601) bestiality
 Thomas Granger (1642) bestiality
 Atefeh Rajabi (2004) adultery

Smuggling
 Kevin Barlow and Brian Chambers (1986), drug trafficking
 Andrew Chan (2015), drug trafficking
 Ong Ah Chuan (1981), drug trafficking
 Johannes van Damme (1994), drug trafficking
 Nagaenthran K. Dharmalingam (2022), drug trafficking
 Vladislav Faibishenko and Yan Rokotov (1961)
 Norasharee Gous (2022), drug trafficking
 Arthur Gray (1748)
 Derrick Gregory (1989), drug trafficking
 Tony de la Guardia (1989), drug trafficking
 Rodrigo Gularte (2015), drug trafficking
 Thomas Kingsmill (1749)
 Louis Mandrin (1755)
 Michael McAuliffe (1993), drug trafficking
 Marco Archer Moreira (2015), drug trafficking
 Shanmugam Murugesu (2005), drug trafficking
 Van Tuong Nguyen, (2005), drug trafficking
 Abdul Kahar Othman (2022), drug trafficking
 Akmal Shaikh (2009), drug trafficking
 Kalwant Singh (2022), drug trafficking
 Myuran Sukumaran (2015), drug trafficking
 Iwuchukwu Amara Tochi (2007), drug trafficking
 Zahra Bahrami (2011), drug trafficking

Treason
 Antonio Osorio de Acuña (1526)
 John Amery (1945)
 George Johnson Armstrong (1941)
 Humphrey Arundell (1550)
 Hristo Atanasov (1908)
 Anthony Babington (1586)
 John Baird (1820)
 Thomas Baker (1381)
 John Ball (1381)
 John Ballard (1586)
 Thomas Bates (1606)
 Jerome Bellamy (1586)
 Nikos Beloyannis (1952)
 Lavrenty Beria (1953)
 Thomas Blount (1400)
 Jeremiah Brandreth (1817)
 John Brown (1859) treason, murder, conspiracy
 Thomas Bryan (1921)
 Archibald Cameron of Lochiel (1753)
 Roger Casement (1916) treason, arms trafficking, sabotage, espionage
 Niren Dasgupta (1915)
 William Davidson (1820)
 Edward Despard (1803)
 Everard Digby (1606)
 Dragutin Dimitrijević (1917)
 Henry Donn (1586)
 Patrick Doyle (1921)
 José María de Torrijos y Uriarte (1791)
 Guy Fawkes (1606) treason, conspiracy
 Gratien Fernando (1942) treason, sabotage, espionage
 Henri de Fleury de Coulan (1666)
 Frank Flood (1921)
 Jopie Fourie (1914)
 Simon Fraser, 11th Lord Lovat (1747)
 Robert Gage (1586)
 Joseph Garang (1971)
 Deniz Gezmiş (1972)
 John Grant (1606)
 Llywelyn ap Gruffydd Fychan (1401)
 Fethi Gürcan (1964)
 Jack Hall (1716)
 Andrew Harclay, 1st Earl of Carlisle (1323)
 Andrew Hardie (1820)
 Cai Hesen (1931)
 Milada Horáková (1950)
 Thomas Howard, 4th Duke of Norfolk (1572) treason, political opponent
 John Hussey, 1st Baron Hussey of Sleaford (1537)
 Kanao Inouye (1947)
 Baillie of Jerviswood (1684)
 William Joyce (1946) treason, political opponent
 Robert Keyes (1606)
 Nguyễn Thị Minh Khai (1941)
 Stanisław Kunicki (1886)
 Christopher Layer (1723)
 Vasil Levski (1873)
 Samuel Lount (1838)
 Johannes Lötter (1901) treason, murder, destruction of public property
 Abdel Khaliq Mahjub (1971)
 Peter Matthews (1838)
 Afanasi Matushenko (1907)
 Vuyisile Mini (1964) treason, murder, sabotage
 Qazi Mohammad (1947)
 David Morgan (1746)
 Mengistu Neway (1961)
 Michel Ney (1815)
 John Nisbet (1685)
 Arnaldo Ochoa (1989)
 José Olaya (1823)
 Johan van Oldenbarnevelt (1619)
 Anzavur Ahmed Pasha (1921)
 Henry Pedris (1915)
 Eleonora Fonseca Pimentel (1799)
 Vishnu Ganesh Pingle (1915)
 Pir of Pagaro VI (1943)
 Carmelo Borg Pisani (1942)
 Louis Riel (1885)
 Ambrose Rookwood (1606)
 Julius and Ethel Rosenberg (1953) and conspiracy to commit espionage
 Bernard Ryan (1921)
 Fahmi Said (1941)
 Salah al-Din al-Sabbagh (1945)
 Policarpa Salavarrieta (1817)
 Mahmud Salman (1942)
 Heba Selim (1974) and espionage
 Kamil Shabib (1944)
 Pyotr Schmidt (1906)
 Theodore Schurch (1946)
 Duncan Scott-Ford (1942)
 Manoranjan Sengupta (1915)
 Abu Taher (1976)
 Arthur Thistlewood (1820)
 Chidiock Tichborne (1586)
 Francis Towneley (1746)
 Thomas Usk (1388)
 Andrey Vlasov (1946)
 Perkin Warbeck (1499)
 Richard Whiting (1539)
 James Wilson (1820)
 Robert Wintour (1606)
 Thomas Wintour (1606)
 John Wrawe (1382)
 Thomas Wyatt the Younger (1554)

Witchcraft

Other

Executed by Tudors

Beheaded

Burned as heretics

Other reasons
 Marinus van der Lubbe (1934), arson

See also
Capital punishment
Capital punishment in Canada
Capital punishment in the People's Republic of China
Capital punishment in India
Capital punishment in New Zealand
Capital punishment in the United Kingdom
Capital punishment in the United States
Lists of people executed in Texas
Lists of people executed in the United States

References

External links
USA Executions and Victims since 1977